Senewosret-Ankh (or Sesostris-Ankh, Senusret-Ankh) was High Priest of Ptah in Memphis, Royal Sculptor, and Builder likely during the time of Senusret I of the 12th Dynasty.

His mastaba was discovered in 1933 near the pyramid of Senusret I at Lisht. The tomb's superstructure was thoroughly destroyed because the stones had been removed. The tomb was looted in antiquity, but some nice pieces of sculpture were found by the excavators, like a limestone sitting statue of Senewosret-Ankh himself, now at the Metropolitan Museum of Art (acc. no. 33.1.2a–c). The walls of the burial chamber were decorated with Pyramid Texts.

References

Memphis High Priests of Ptah
Officials of the Twelfth Dynasty of Egypt
Egyptian sculptors